Chambéry Airport or Chambéry-Savoie Airport , also known as Chambéry Aix-les-Bains Airport, is a small international airport near Chambéry, a commune in Savoy, France. Commercial activities started at the airport in 1960.

Facilities

It has one paved runway designated which measures .

Airlines and destinations
The following airlines operate regular scheduled and charter flights at Chambéry Airport:

Airport statistics

References

External links

Chambéry-Savoie Airport (official site) 
Aéroport de Chambéry-Savoie (Union des Aéroports Français) 

Airports in Auvergne-Rhône-Alpes
Buildings and structures in Savoie
Transport in Chambéry